The FIL World Luge Natural Track Championships 1992 took place in Bad Goisern, Austria.

Men's singles

Women's singles

Panyutina is the first person not from Austria or Italy to win a World Luge Natural Track Championship event.

Men's doubles

Medal table

References
Men's doubles natural track World Champions
Men's singles natural track World Champions
Women's singles natural track World Champions

FIL World Luge Natural Track Championships
1992 in luge
1992 in Austrian sport
Luge in Austria